Lake Ngatu is a dune lake in the Northland Region of New Zealand. It is located to the northwest of Awanui, near Waipapakauri.

Lake Ngatu has no inlets or outlets. The lake catchment is primarily manuka/kanuka scrub and fenced pasture. There are houses overlooking the lake.

Recreation 
Lake Ngatu is a popular recreation area, and is easily accessed via West Coast Road and Sweetwater Road. There is a  loop walking track around the perimeter of the lake.

Water quality and ecology 
The water quality of Lake Ngatu has been highlighted in recent times, with particular concerns of a summer algal bloom threat.

The lake is monitored by Northland Regional Council, and the environmental information can be viewed on the LAWA website.

See also
List of lakes in New Zealand

References

External links 
https://www.doc.govt.nz/parks-and-recreation/places-to-go/northland/places/lake-ngatu-recreation-reserve/tracks/lake-ngatu-track/
Lake Ngatu - Water Quality and Ecological Indicators LAWA
https://www.nrc.govt.nz/media/9534/lakengatumanagementplanwebsite.pdf
https://www.stuff.co.nz/life-style/life/76408477/no-wharf-no-problem-kaitaia-kids-do-ladder-bombs

Ngatu
Far North District